The 1930 Campeonato Carioca, the 25th edition of that championship, kicked off on April 6, 1930 and ended on December 28, 1930. It was organized by AMEA (Associação Metropolitana de Esportes Atléticos, or Metropolitan Athletic Sports Association). Eleven teams participated. Botafogo won the title for the 4th time. No teams were relegated.

Participating teams

System 
The tournament would be disputed in a double round-robin format, with the team with the most points winning the title.

Championship

References 

Campeonato Carioca seasons
Carioca